ITFC may refer to:

 International Islamic Trade Finance Corporation, a finance company in Saudi Arabia
 Ipswich Town F.C., a football club in England, United Kingdom